Bruce Statue may refer to:
 Statue of Bruce Lee (disambiguation)
 Statue of Bruce Lee (Hong Kong)
 Statue of Bruce Lee (Los Angeles)
 Statue of Bruce Lee (Mostar)
 Statue of Robert the Bruce (disambiguation)
 Equestrian statue of Robert the Bruce, Bannockburn
 Statue of Robert the Bruce, Stirling Castle

See also
 The Special Warfare Memorial Statue, known as Bronze Bruce